Empagliflozin/linagliptin/metformin, sold under the brand name Trijardy XR, is a drug combination used for the treatment of type 2 diabetes. It is a combination of empagliflozin, linagliptin, and metformin. Empagliflozin/linagliptin/metformin was approved for use in the United States in January 2020.

Adverse effects
To lessen the risk of developing ketoacidosis (a serious condition in which the body produces high levels of blood acids called ketones) after surgery, the FDA has approved changes to the prescribing information for SGLT2 inhibitor diabetes medicines to recommend they be stopped temporarily before scheduled surgery. Empagliflozin should each be stopped at least three days before scheduled surgery.

Symptoms of ketoacidosis include nausea, vomiting, abdominal pain, tiredness, and trouble breathing.

History
The combination preparation was developed and marketed by Boehringer Ingelheim Pharmaceuticals, Inc. and Eli Lilly and Company.

References

External links
 
 
 
 
 

Alkyne derivatives
Anti-diabetic drugs
Boehringer Ingelheim
Combination drugs
Dipeptidyl peptidase-4 inhibitors
Eli Lilly and Company brands
SGLT2 inhibitors